М7 highway connects Minsk with Lithuanian border (it continues in Lithuania as A3). It is a part of European route E28 and Branch B of Pan-European Corridor IX. The highway is around 139 km long. It begins at the intersection of Pritycki street with Minsk Ring Road M9 and runs west, sharing the first 47 km with M6 highway. It then branches off from M6 near Volozhin and goes north-west near Ashmyany to Kamenny Log border crossing.

Roads in Belarus 
International road networks